Santa Maria Maddalena is a Baroque-style Roman Catholic church located on Via Bartocci  in the town of Esanatoglia, province of Macerata, in the region of Marche, Italy.

History
A church was present at the site prior to the 16th century, known as Santa Maria Maddalena de Insula, and linked to a Benedictine order nunnery under the rule of the Abbey of Sant'Angelo infra Ostia. The church was rebuilt in the late 17th-century in an oval layout. While the exterior façade is plain, the portal in white stone is elegant. The main altarpiece is made of gilded wood, and houses a 17th-century altarpiece depicting a Crucifixion with the Virgin and Saints John the Evangelist, Mary Magdalen, Clare, and Francis. The wooden choir loft, on the counterfacade, has a twelve panels with paintings depicting Saints and landscapes. In the early 19th century, the convent was suppressed and it became a nursing home. The convent has a fresco cycle (early 15th-century) attributed to Ottaviano Nelli.

References

17th-century Roman Catholic church buildings in Italy
Baroque architecture in Marche
Esanatoglia
Roman Catholic churches in the Marche